Two human polls make up the 2022–23 NCAA Division I women's basketball rankings, the AP Poll and the Coaches Poll, in addition to various publications' preseason polls.

Legend

AP Poll
The women's basketball poll began during the 1976–77 season, and was initially compiled by Mel Greenberg and published by The Philadelphia Inquirer. At first, it was a poll of coaches conducted via telephone, where coaches identified top teams and a list of the Top 20 teams was produced. The contributors continued to be coaches until 1994, when the AP took over administration of the poll from Greenberg, and switched to a panel of writers. Three Texas teams were in the very first ranking in 1976: Wayland Baptist, Stephen F. Austin and Baylor. On January 23, 2023, for the first time in 47 years, no teams from Texas were in the top 25, ending an 835-week run with at least one Texas team in the rankings.

USA Today Coaches Poll
The Coaches Poll is the second oldest poll still in use after the AP Poll. It is compiled by a rotating group of 31 college Division I head coaches. The Poll operates by Borda count. Each voting member ranks teams from 1 to 25. Each team then receives points for their ranking in reverse order: Number 1 earns 25 points, number 2 earns 24 points, and so forth. The points are then combined and the team with the highest points is then ranked No. 1; second highest is ranked No. 2 and so forth. Only the top 25 teams with points are ranked, with teams receiving first place votes noted the quantity next to their name. The maximum points a single team can earn is 775.

See also
2022–23 NCAA Division I men's basketball rankings

References

College women's basketball rankings in the United States